Valide sultan (lit. 'mother sultan') was the title held by the "legal mother" of a ruling sultan of the Ottoman Empire. The title was first formally used in the 16th century during Hafsa Sultan's, mother of Sultan Suleyman I, reign, superseding the previous title of mehd-i ulya ("cradle of the great"). or "the nacre of the pearl of the sultanate". Normally, the living mother of a reigning sultan held this title. In special cases sisters, grandmothers and stepmothers of a reigning sultan assumed the title .

Term
The word  literally means 'mother' in Ottoman Turkish, from Arabic .

Sultan is an Arabic word originally meaning 'authority' or 'dominion'. By the beginning of the 16th century, this title, carried by both men and women of the Ottoman dynasty, was replacing other titles by which prominent members of the imperial family had been known (notably hatun for women and bey for men). Consequently, the title  (title for living mother of reigning Ottoman sultan before 16th century) also turned into . This usage underlines the Ottoman conception of sovereign power as family prerogative.

The emperor's formal title consisted of sultan together with khan (for example, Sultan Suleiman Khan). In formal address, the sultan's children were also entitled sultan, with imperial princes (şehzade) carrying the title before their given name, with imperial princesses carrying it after. For example, Şehzade Sultan Mehmed and Mihrimah Sultan were the son and daughter of Suleiman the Magnificent. Like imperial princesses, the living mother and main consort of reigning sultans also carried the title after their given names, for example, Hafsa Sultan, Suleiman's mother and first , and Hürrem Sultan, Suleiman's chief consort and first haseki sultan. Henceforth, the mother of the reigning sultan was the only person of non-imperial blood to carry the title sultan.

Role and position 

 was, in most cases, the most important position in the Ottoman Empire after the sultan himself. As the mother to the sultan, by Islamic tradition ("A mother's right is God's right"), the  would have a significant influence on the affairs of the empire. She had great power in the court and her own rooms (always adjacent to her son's) and state staff. The valide sultan had quarters within the New Palace, where the Sultan himself resided, beginning in the 16th century. As the Valide sultan (Sultana mother), who had direct and intimate access to the Sultan's person, often influenced government decisions bypassing the Imperial Council and the Grand Vizier altogether or the grille-covered window from which the Sultan or Valide sultan could observe Council meetings. This left her at the heart of the political ongoings and machinations of the Ottoman Empire.  also traditionally had access to considerable economic resources and often funded major architectural projects, such as the Atik Valide Mosque Complex in Istanbul. Many valide sultans undertook massive philanthropic endeavors and buildings, as this was seen as one of the main ways to demonstrate influence and wealth. Valide sultans were also conveniently one of the few people within the empire with the station and means to embark on these expensive projects. Nurbanu Sultan’s daily stipend as valide sultan to her son, Murad III, was 2000 aspers, an extraordinary sum for the time, which revealed the highly influential position valide sultans held at court. The valide sultan also maintained special privileges that other harem members could not participate in. A valide sultan was not subject to sole seclusion within the confines of the palace. She had mobility outside of the harem, sometimes through ceremonial visibility to the public or veiled meetings with government officials and diplomats. Additionally, the valide sultan spearheaded one of the most crucial elements of diplomacy within the Ottoman Empire’s court: marriages of royal princesses. The most powerful and influential valide sultans had multiple daughters, with whom they forged crucial alliances through by marriage. Various Valide sultans acted as regents for their sons, assuming the vast power and influence the position entailed.

The most powerful and well-known of all  in the history of the Ottoman Empire were Mihrimah Sultan, Nurbanu Sultan, Safiye Sultan, Kösem Sultan, and Turhan Sultan. 

Sultan Nurbanu Sultan became the first of the great valide sultans during the sixteenth century, as haseki and legal wife to Sultan Selim II. Nurbanu’s influential career as valide sultan established the precedent of valide sultan maintaining more power than her nearest harem rival, the haseki, or favorite concubine of the reigning sultan. The following influential valide sultans, Safiye Sultan, Kösem Sultan and Turhan Sultan, maintained this precedent and occupied positions of extreme power within the Ottoman imperial court. These positions helped them solidify their own power within the imperial court and ease diplomatic tensions on a broader, international scale.

Since Hurrem Sultan died before her son, Selim II, became Sultan she never became a valide sultan. In an extremely rare case in Ottoman history, Selim II bestowed the title of valide sultan upon his older sister, Mihrimah Sultan. It became the only incident in Ottoman history that a valide sultan was a member of the Ottoman royal family, thus reflecting Mihrimah's power.

Most harem women who were slaves were never formally married to the sultans. Nevertheless, their children were considered fully legitimate under Islamic law if recognized by the father.

List of  
The list does not include the complete list of mothers of the Ottoman sultans.

Exceptional cases 
But in exceptional cases, there were women did not exercise valide sultan's duties when their sons became sultan.

The title of Büyük Valide Sultan (Senior Valide Sultan) or Büyükanne Sultan (Grandmother Sultana) was created by Kösem Sultan and officially used only by her during the reign of her grandson Mehmed IV, thus limiting the power of Turhan Sultan who was deemed too young to fulfill the title of Valide Sultan.

The official and unofficials Büyük Valide Sultan that lived in the reign of their grandsons are:

See also

Hanımefendi
Harem
Haseki Sultan
Kadınefendi
List of mothers of the Ottoman sultans
List of Ottoman titles and appellations
Ottoman family tree
Seraglio
Sultana (title)

References

Further reading

External links
 Guide2womenleaders.com

 
Lists of queens
Turkish words and phrases